Catholic Distance University (CDU) is a private online Roman Catholic university based in Charles Town, West Virginia. It offers undergraduate and graduate degrees and certificate programs. CDU's programs aim to meet the goals set out in the Ex Corde Ecclesiae issued by Pope John Paul II regarding Catholic colleges and universities. CDU was the first Catholic institution to offer an MA in Theology completely online. Several Catholic dioceses partner with CDU to help train their catechists.

History
Catholic Distance University was established in 1983 in the Arlington diocese by Bishop Thomas Jerome Welsh. In 2015, the university relocated its headquarters to Charles Town, West Virginia, as part of its strategic vision. CDU offers an accredited bachelor's degree completion program in theology, a master's degree in theology, a master's degree in theology and educational ministry, graduate certificates, an undergraduate certificate, a catechetical diploma, and a variety of catechetical certificates. The university's programs are offered completely online; CDU launched its online campus in 2005. According to Georgetown University's Center for Applied Research in the Apostolate, in the academic year 2007–2008, CDU was the top Lay Ecclesial Ministry Program by number of enrollments.

Presidents
In 2003, Bishop Paul Loverde became the university president as Bishop Thomas Jerome Welsh, the university's founder, became chairman emeritus. Bishop Loverde was succeeded by Marianne Evans Mount in 2008.
 Bishop Thomas Jerome Welsh (1986–2003)
 Bishop Paul Loverde (2003–2008)
 Marianne Evans Mount: (2008–present)

Academics
Catholic Distance University currently offers the Associate of Arts, Bachelor of Arts, and Master of Arts. It also offers graduate certificates and non-degree programs. All of the degree programs and certificates focus on religious topics such as theology, ministry, or church history.

Accreditation and affiliations
The West Virginia Higher Education Policy Commission authorized Catholic Distance University to operate as a degree-granting institution of higher education in West Virginia. The State Council of Higher Education for Virginia certifies CDU to operate in Virginia as an out-of-state private, non-profit degree-granting institution. It is accredited by the Distance Education Accrediting Commission and the Higher Learning Commission with its Graduate School of Theology accredited by the Association of Theological Schools.

In March 2015 the university was also approved for membership in the International Federation of Catholic Universities on the recommendation of Catholic University of America and Australian Catholic University.

Notable faculty and alumni
Clayton Fountain, federal prisoner serving a life sentence who converted to Catholicism in prison

References

External links

Distance education institutions based in the United States
Roman Catholic Ecclesiastical Province of Baltimore
Catholic universities and colleges in West Virginia
Roman Catholic Diocese of Wheeling-Charleston
Educational institutions established in 1983
1983 establishments in Virginia
Distance Education Accreditation Commission